Bühne is a village and constituent community (Stadtteil) of the East Westphalian town Borgentreich in Höxter district and Detmold region in North Rhine-Westphalia, Germany. Bühne has approximately 1,200 inhabitants. With 23 km² it is the second largest constituent community of Borgentreich.

History 
Bühne was first mentioned in a document around 850 under the name Piun. It was one of the fortified castles of the nobility of the Prince-Bishopric of Paderborn. Piun is a Bavarian dialect version of Bühne that was used by the author of that document, the head of administration of King Arnulf.

On 1 January 1975, Bühne was integrated into the city of Borgentreich as a constituent community.

References

Further reading
 Hengst, Karl; Klotz, Josef & Seehase, Günter (1990): ''Piun Bühne - Kulturgeschichte eines Dorfes in Ostwestfalen. Paderborn: Bonifatius.

External links 
 Web portal about Bühne-Piun

Villages in North Rhine-Westphalia